The Slovenia national speedway team are motorcycle speedway national team from Slovenia. They were 2nd in 2006 European Pairs Speedway Championship.

Speedway World Cup

Riders

European Pairs Championship

Team U-21 World Championship

Honours

World Championships

European Championships

References 
 Świat Żużla, No 1 (75) /2008, page 24, .

See also 
 Slovenian Individual Speedway Championship
 Speedway Grand Prix of Slovenia

National speedway teams
Speedway
Team